Calloway County High School is a public high school located in Murray, Kentucky, United States. The school was formed from the consolidation of six high schools from across the county:  Hazel High School, Lynn Grove High School, Kirksey High School,  Almo High School, New Concord High School, and  Faxon High School.

Organizations

Clubs and Organizations:

 Academic Team
 Archery
 Band
 Bass Fishing
 B.A.S.S. Club
 Beta Club
 Cheer
 Chemistry Team
 Choir
 Educators Rising
 FFA
 F.B.L.A.
 Future Problem Solving Team
 HOSA
 Kentucky United Nations Assembly
 Kentucky Youth Assembly
 Laker Review 
 Leadership Tomorrow
 National Science Honor Society
 Pep Club
 Robotics Team
 Senior Class Prom Committee
 Science Bowl Team
 Skills USA
 Spanish Club
 Speech Team
 Student Council
 Technology Student Association
 Yearbook

Athletic Clubs:

 Baseball
 Boys Basketball
 Girls Basketball
 Cross Country (boys & girls)
 Football
 Golf (boys & girls)
 Boys Soccer
 Girls Soccer
 Fast Pitch Softball
 Tennis (boys & girls)
 Track (boys & girls)
 Volleyball
 Wrestling
 Cheerleading

State champions

Wrestling: David Woods 195 lbs (2017)
Bass Fishing: Bracken Robertson & Dillon Starks (2013)
Boys Cross Country: 1984 (2A)
Fast Pitch Softball: 2004
Girls Golf: 2012 (Individual, Anna Hack)

Notable alumni
W. Earl Brown, actor

References

Educational institutions established in 1960
Schools in Calloway County, Kentucky
Public high schools in Kentucky
1960 establishments in Kentucky
Murray, Kentucky